Tushingham is a surname. Notable people with the surname include:

Doug Tushingham (1914–2002), Canadian archaeologist
Rita Tushingham (born 1942), English actress
Sidney Tushingham (1884–1968), British painter and etcher

See also
Tushingham, a village in Cheshire, England